National road 3 is a route belonging to the Polish national road network. The highway connects the northwestern and southwestern regions of Poland, running from Świnoujście at the German border to Jakuszyce at the Czech border, traversing through the West Pomeranian, Lubusz and Lower Silesian voivodeships. National road 3 is a component of European highway E65.

National road 3 is currently being upgraded to express road S3, with the older highway being classified as Gmina road running parallel or near the completed sections of the modern expressway.

Major cities and towns along the route 
 Świnoujście (road 93) 
 Goleniów (road 6) 
 Szczecin (road 6, 10)
 Myślibórz (road 26)
 Gorzów Wielkopolski (road 22)
 Skwierzyna (road 24)
 Świebodzin (road 2)
 Sulechów (road 32)
 Zielona Góra (road 32)
 Drożów (road 12)
 Lubin (road 36)
 Legnica (road 4, 94)
 Bolków (road 5)
 Jelenia Góra (road 30)
 Jakuszyce, border with Czech Republic

03